Bhonda Mahadev Temple (also called as mumda deval) is an ancient Hindu temple  located in Nagpur, Maharashtra, India.

References

Hindu temples in Maharashtra
Shiva temples in Maharashtra
Buildings and structures in Nagpur